We Got Married (Season 3) is the third season of South Korean reality-variety show We Got Married, a segment of MBC's Sunday Sunday Night program. First broadcast in 2008, the show pairs up Korean celebrities to show what life would be like if they were married. Each week, couples are assigned missions to complete, with candid interviews of the participants to reveal their thoughts and feelings.

Format
With a new format and slightly different couples, newlyweds are given a mission to complete each week. As during the special pilot episode, interviewed participants provide a unique perspective on the ongoing relationship conflicts and developments. All of the recorded material is then played in front of the participants, MCs, and audience who add commentary or clarification.

Season three officially began on April 9, with two additional couples upon the departure of Yonghwa & Seohyun, as well as a new format. Park Hwi Sun and K.will were added for Season III to the cast as MCs. In September 2011, new couple Leeteuk of Super Junior and actress Kang So-ra joined the cast with their first episode airing on 24 September with guest appearances by fellow Super Junior members, Eunhyuk, Donghae, Kyuhyun and Sungmin; who continue to guest star for a few more episodes.

On 14 May 2012, the show was temporarily cancelled, due to the long-running MBC strike, it was replaced by reruns and other special programs. The programme resumed on 16 June 2012, with production by an outside source. On 20 August 2012 the production team announced the departure of Ham Eun-jeong of T-ara and Lee Jang-woo, with their last broadcast episode aired on 25 August. They were replaced with new couple Julien Kang and Yoon Se-ah.

In September 2012, new couple Lee Joon of MBLAQ and Oh Yeon-seo replaced departing couple Leeteuk and Kang So-ra. Their last episode was broadcast on 8 September as Leeteuk enlisted to serve his mandatory military service on 30 October 2012.

Couples
 Nichkhun & Victoria (Ep 1-24)
 Eunjung & Lee Jang-woo (Ep 1-55)
 Park So-hyun & Kim Won-jun (Ep 1-40)

Additional couples
 David Oh & Kwon Ri-se (Ep 11-24)
 Leeteuk & Kang So-ra (Ep 25-55)
 Julien Kang & Yoon Se-ah (Ep 54-55)

Episode summaries

References

External links 
 Official Website

We Got Married
2011 South Korean television seasons